Buwalasi Theological College is an Anglican educational institution in Mbale, Uganda.

The first principal was Canon John McDonald.

Notable faculty
 Keith Russell
 Erisa Masaba

Notable alumni
 Geresom Ilukor
 Yona Okoth
 Janani Luwum
 Peter Mudonyi
 Christopher Senyonjo
 Stephen Tomusange
 John Wasikye
 Akisoferi Wesonga

References

Anglican seminaries and theological colleges
Universities and colleges in Uganda
Bulwalasi Theological College alumni
Bulwalasi Theological College faculty